The Superstars was a televised sporting event featuring ten top athletes from ten different sports competing in events that were not their own. The idea was developed by Dick Button who shopped the idea to all three U.S. television networks.  The show was sold to ABC which aired it as a two-hour ABC Sports special in the winter of 1973.

By the end of 1973, a similar event appeared in Great Britain and within a few years, separate competitions were being held in nearly a dozen countries including Australia, Canada, Ireland, Netherlands, New Zealand and Sweden. The U.S. version grew to encompass women, entire sporting teams and celebrities and lasted off and on for three decades, from 1973 until 2003. It was briefly revived in 2009.

Overview
Bob Seagren, an Olympic pole vault gold medalist, was the first winner. However, it was heavyweight champion boxer Joe Frazier who nearly stole the show. In the very first event, the 50 meter swimming heats, Frazier nearly drowned, and only after he was retrieved from the pool did he admit to commentators that he didn't know how to swim. When a reporter asked him why he tried the race, Frazier replied, "How was I to know I couldn't unless I tried it?"  He also famously opined, "That Mark Spitz," (who had won several gold medals for swimming at the 1972 Olympics) "is a tough muthafucker!"

Spin-offs included a women's version of the show, and a Superteams version, where the two World Series and Super Bowl teams each faced off (except that the owner of the New York Yankees at the time prohibited his players from competing, so in years where the Yankees were in the World Series, their league's runner-up competed instead), with the winners competing in the finals. There were also brief runs of versions for celebrities and for juniors, where each state's Department of Education was asked to nominate one high school, and those schools each sent one boy and one girl to qualifying rounds, with the final aired on TV.

The show remained popular in the 1970s, but ratings declined and the last edition produced by ABC came in 1984. NBC Sports picked up the program the next year and carried it from 1985 to 1990. ABC took the show back in 1991, and broadcast it through 1994. During a three-year period (1991–1993) the event was held in Cancun, Mexico. The competitions were held in different areas of Cancun Palace and Melia Cancun hotels. During that period former great NFL players Frank Gifford, Dan Dierdorf and Lynn Swann worked as commentators of the Superstars Tournament.

There was no American version for three years (1995–1997); then ABC revived the show in 1998 and broadcast it through 2002. CBS Sports picked up the show the next year.

Several athletes won the event two or more times. Among them:
 Kyle Rote, Jr., Soccer (1974, 1976, 1977)
 Renaldo Nehemiah, track and field/American football (1981–83, 1986)
 Herschel Walker, American football (1987–88)
 Willie Gault, American football (1989–90)
 Dave Johnson, decathlon (1993–94)
 Jason Sehorn, American football (1998–2000)

Speed skater Anne Henning won three straight women's competitions (1976–78). Basketball player Ann Meyers matched that feat in 1981 through 1983. Volleyball player Linda Fernandez won two straight events in 1979 and 1980.

List of champions

Gameplay

Obstacle course variations
The obstacle course was the final event of the original Superstars to determine the overall winner. The Superteams version featured the obstacle course as an earlier event. The original course had the contestants climb a 12' rope wall, run through a tubular tunnel, push a blocking sled (or traverse across monkey bars in the Women's and Superteams versions), cleanly step through two rows of tires (originally 9, later increased to 2 even rows of 6), jump over a 12' water hazard (rectangular pool of water), clear a 4'6" high bar, jump two sets of hurdles and cross the FINISH line. Penalty seconds were added for missing tires, stepping in the water hazard and knocking down the high bar. Some athletes have shown super skills on this course by climbing the wall without using the rope and clearing the high bar like a hurdle.

For the 2009 "elimination event" version, contestants have to climb a rope wall, duck under four rope hurdles (2 sets side-by-side) (this was changed mid-season to a balance beam just over 3-inches wide), cleanly step through a bungee grid, ascend and descend a large ramp, push through a large door-like block, jump two sets of hurdles, run through a cargo net and cross the FINISH line.

SuperTeams
From 1975 until 1983, a second team-based competition was held as an accompaniment to the annual Superstars competition. The SuperTeams, as it was dubbed, was a three-week competition as presented on television. In the first two weeks, two matches were conducted with one featuring the teams from the previous year’s World Series and the other featuring the teams that played in the previous year’s Super Bowl. The winners then faced each other to determine an overall winner. The only exception was in the final competition, where only one match was
conducted.

The SuperTeams employees all the Superstars events, with some team events added such as Hawaiian rowing and the Tug-of-War. There were, however, variations due to the format being team based and not individual based. The running, swimming, and cycling events were relays, with the cycling done on tandem bicycles. The obstacle course's blocking sleds were replaced with monkey bars, due to the perceived advantage the football teams had with using them. The team that won the most events over the course of the competition was declared the winner.

In the 1978 final, the Dallas Cowboys and Kansas City Royals split the first six events, so the tug-of-war would decide the winner. However, while there was a time limit in the preliminary rounds, there was none in the final, and after 75 minutes in which neither team came particularly close to winning, the organizers declared the event (and, as a result, the competition) a tie.

In three of the SuperTeams competitions, the World Series teams were not fully represented. In those three years, the New York Yankees were the American League representative. After the team participated in the 1977 edition, team owner George Steinbrenner refused to allow his players to compete in any further extracurricular athletic competitions; he also was not pleased with the timing of the events as they were conducted in February each year, which interfered with the start of baseball’s spring training. The 1978, 1979, and 1982 competitions were affected; in those years the team the Yankees defeated in the American League Championship Series took their place. The Kansas City Royals participated in and won the first two of those three competitions, while the Oakland Athletics participated in and won the other.

The Pittsburgh Steelers represented the NFL in four SuperTeams competitions, winning once. The Dallas Cowboys participated three times, also winning once. The Minnesota Vikings, Oakland Raiders and Miami Dolphins each participated twice; none of those teams managed to win.

The Los Angeles Dodgers competed in the most competitions for Major League Baseball, winning the 1975 event and returning in 1978, 1979, and 1982. The Kansas City Royals, the only multiple winner, entered in three competitions, their winning 1978 and 1979 efforts and a return trip in 1981. Baseball was also represented twice each by the Cincinnati Reds, in 1976 and 1977, and the Oakland Athletics, in 1975 and 1982. The other participants were the aforementioned Yankees (1977), the Boston Red Sox (1976), the Baltimore Orioles (1980), the Pittsburgh Pirates (also 1980), the Philadelphia Phillies (1981), and the St. Louis Cardinals (1983).

SuperTeams winners

 1975: Los Angeles Dodgers
 1976: Pittsburgh Steelers
 1977: Cincinnati Reds
 1978: (tie) Dallas Cowboys and Kansas City Royals
 1979: Kansas City Royals
 1980: Los Angeles Rams
 1981: Philadelphia Eagles
 1982: Oakland Athletics
 1983: Washington Redskins

2009 revival edition
In 2009 the franchise was revived for ABC. The Superstars paired athletes and celebrities to compete as a team. Kristi Leskinen (Freestyle Skiing) and Maksim Chmerkovskiy (Ballroom Dancing) won the competition.

Filming
On January 6, 2009, Variety reported that Juma Entertainment and Blue Entertainment Sports TV would produce a six-week series on ABC starting on June 23, 2009 featuring pairing of celebrities and athletes with one pair being eliminated each week. Principal location filming took place in the Bahamas.

Participants
The participating stars are:

Judges' scoring summary

 indicates the team eliminated.
 indicates the team withdrew.
 indicates the teams that went to the Obstacle Course.
 indicates the team that won the rubber match.
 indicates the winning team.
 indicates the runner-up team.
 indicates the third place team.

An early leaked clip showed Supermodel Joanna Krupa displeased with the performance of her teammate, Terrell Owens. This occurs in the first episode, during an elimination competition involving the obstacle course in which Mr. Owens gets tangled in the cargo net obstacle and loses a race. Lisa Leslie also struggled with the cargo net obstacle to the point that she became disoriented and reversed her direction, exiting the obstacle in the wrong direction and almost racing towards an obstacle she had already completed.  These two teams (Owens/Krupa v. Leslie/Cortese) then go into a final race to determine who goes home.  Although Owens performed better this time, Cortese stayed close enough behind him that Krupa was unable to outrace Leslie and Owens/Krupa were the first team eliminated from the competition.  Krupa continued to vent her frustration and disappointment in Owens's performance well after the race was over, stating that she expected better results from such a well-known athlete. They had lost a kayak race earlier. A better performance in any of the events (the duathlon, in which they finished middle-of-the-pack, two kayak races that they lost, and two obstacle course races that they lost) would have permitted them to stay in the competition. However, there was no explanation as to why Owens/Krupa with their fourth-place finish (20 points ahead of two teams that tied for fifth place) were even in a "tiebreak" situation to begin with, and the show was also silent on what tiebreaker separated the two fifth-place teams, sending one to the obstacle course automatically while putting the other in a "rubber match" kayak race against Owens/Krupa—who clearly finished 20 points ahead of the fifth-place teams in the standings.

Along with Leslie/Cortese, Capriati/Charvet also struggled during the first round of competitions; most significant was Capriati missing the exchange of the bike between the teammates in the first event (a 1.1 mile duathlon) when she failed to spot it propped against a barricade where her partner had left it for her, and had to run nearly the entire distance of the road course.

In the second episode, the Capriati/Charvet team was disbanded after Capriati had been injured, and Owens and Krupa were allowed back on the show to compete in their stead. Dan Cortese withdrew from the competition due to an injury during the second episode, and he was replaced by Charvet as Leslie's partner.

The hosting cast is ESPN's John Saunders, former NFL All-Pro defensive tackle Warren Sapp, and NFL sideline reporter, fitness model, and TV host Jenn Brown (an accomplished athlete in her own right, having captained the University of Florida softball team).

References

External links
 'The Superstars': a page describing the Superstars competitions over the years.

Sports entertainment
1973 American television series debuts
2009 American television series endings
1970s American television series
1980s American television series
1990s American television series
2000s American television series
American sports television series
American Broadcasting Company original programming
ABC Sports
NBC original programming
NBC Sports
CBS original programming
CBS Sports
Wide World of Sports (American TV series)
English-language television shows
American television series revived after cancellation